= Sharatchandra Pankanti =

Sharatchandra Pankanti from the IBM Thomas J. Watson Research Center, Yorktown Heights, NY was named Fellow of the Institute of Electrical and Electronics Engineers (IEEE) in 2012 for contributions to biometrics and surveillance systems.
